Dumitru Ivanov (1 January 1946 – 4 June 2021) was a Moldovan politician.

Biography 
He served as member of the Parliament of Moldova (2005–2009).

References

1946 births
2021 deaths
Moldovan MPs 2005–2009
Electoral Bloc Democratic Moldova MPs
Politicians from Chișinău